The Big Picture is the second and final studio album by American rapper Big L. The album was slated for a 1999 release, but due to L's murder, it was posthumously released on August 1, 2000, on Rawkus Records. It was incomplete at the time of Big L's death, and was posthumously completed by his manager and partner in Flamboyant Entertainment, Rich King. Recording sessions for the album took place primarily at D&D Studios in New York City, New York throughout 1998 and early 1999. It was produced by DJ Premier (who also executive produced the album), Ron Browz, Ron G, Lord Finesse, Pete Rock, Shomari, Mike Heron, Ysae, and Showbiz. The Big Picture features appearances from Fat Joe, Remy Ma, Guru, Kool G Rap, Big Daddy Kane, 2Pac, Sadat X, and more. It was certified Gold by the Recording Industry Association of America in October 2000.

It sold 72,549 copies in the first week.

Critical reception

The Big Picture has received critical acclaim. M.F. DiBella of Allmusic gave the album three out of five stars. RapReviews' Steve Juon gave it eight out of ten stars. Rolling Stone gave it three and a half stars out of five. Many say that it is one of the most underrated hip hop albums of all time.

Content 
The track "The Enemy", featuring fellow New York rapper Fat Joe, talks about the NYPD in a negative way, "criticizing its provoking and shady ways", according to April Park of the Riverfront Times.

Track listing
Writers by Allmusic.

Personnel
Credits for The Big Picture adapted from Allmusic.

 Louis Alfred III — mixing
 Big Daddy Kane — performer
 Big L — executive producer, performer
 Bob Brown — engineer
 Ron Browz — producer
 Rob Dinero — composer, engineer
 DJ Premier — executive producer, producer
 Fat Joe — performer
 2Pac - performer, writer
 Mike Heron — executive producer, producer
 Kool G Rap — performer
 Lord Finesse — executive producer, mixing, producer
 Eric Lynch — engineer
 Miss Jones — performer
 Pete Rock — producer
 Sadat X — performer
 Shomari — producer
 Duncan Stanbury — mastering
 Max Vargas — engineer
 Carlisle Young — mixing
 YSAE — producer

Charts

Weekly charts

Year-end chart

Certifications

Release history

References

External links 
 The Big Picture at Allmusic
 The Big Picture 1974–1999 at Discogs

2000 albums
Big L albums
Rawkus Records albums
Albums produced by Ron Browz
Albums produced by DJ Premier
Albums produced by Lord Finesse
Albums produced by Pete Rock
Albums published posthumously